Matthew Charles Tebbutt (born 24 December 1973) is a British chef and television food presenter best known for presenting shows such as Channel 4's Food Unwrapped and Drop Down Menu, the BBC's Saturday Kitchen and the Good Food channel's Market Kitchen. Matt ran The Foxhunter in Nant-y-derry for many years with his wife, Lisa, but gave it up to focus on his TV career.

Early life
Matthew Charles Tebbutt was born on 24 December 1973 in High Wycombe, Buckinghamshire and moved to South Wales when he was only six months old. He was educated at Rougemont School in Newport. He studied Geography and Anthropology at Oxford Brookes University.

Training
Tebbutt gained a diploma at Leiths School of Food and Wine in London, before working for some of London's most prestigious restaurants. This includes Marco Pierre White at the Oak Room and Criterion, and Alastair Little whom he cites as the greatest influence on his cuisine.

Career

Television roles
Tebbutt often presented Saturday Kitchen on BBC One while regular host James Martin was away. He has since returned to the show as a guest presenter and now regular host of the show following Martin’s departure.

Tebbutt currently presents Food Unwrapped on Channel 4 alongside Kate Quilton and Jimmy Doherty. He also presented "Market Kitchen" with Tom Parker-Bowles and Matthew Fort and its successor "Market Kitchen: Big Adventure" alongside Penny Smith. He has also appeared on the Great British Menu and "Great British Food Revival". Tebbutt also co-presented Channel 4's Drop Down Menu with Gizzi Erskine.

In December 2016, he co-presented Christmas Kitchen, a daytime series for BBC One. His co-host was Andi Oliver. He has also co-presented two series of Save Money: Good Food for ITV alongside Susanna Reid.

In April 2020 it was announced that Tebbutt would co-host Daily Kitchen Live on BBC One alongside Jack Monroe. The show is made by Cactus TV who also created Saturday Kitchen. The programme, made in response to issues stemming from the COVID-19 pandemic, offers tips and guidance to families struggling with limited resources for a two-week period commencing 14 April 2020.

Restaurants
He owned and ran the Foxhunter restaurant in Nant-y-derry near Usk in South Wales for 15 years. The restaurant has won a number of awards including the AA Restaurant of the Year for Wales. It is now leased as a pub while Tebbutt concentrates on his TV career.

Books
In 2008, Tebbutt published Cooks Country: Modern British Rural Cooking. He is also the author of Guilty Pleasures.

Personal life 

Matt and Lisa married in 1999.

References

External links
 
 profile on UKTV Food
 biography on biogs.com

1973 births
English chefs
Living people
English television chefs
People from High Wycombe